Augochlorella aurata is a species of sweat bee (bees attracted by the salt in human sweat) in the family Halictidae. It is found in North America east of the Rocky Mountains. The body is a brilliant green metallic color, diffused to varying extents with a copper, red, or yellow color. Its length is 5 to 7 mm. A common name is golden green sweat bee.

Description and identification 
Members of Augochlorella aurata are usually a golden green color but can range from a metallic blue to a coppery pink. Both males and females of Augochlorella aurata are around 5-7mm, females usually being slightly larger than males.  Like many bees, the females have 11 antennal segments and the males have 10. The propodeum is relatively uniform, with no ridge, separating it from bees in a closely related genus, Agapostemon. The hind tibial spur is simple or slightly serrated, distinguishing it from the genus Augochloropsis. Like many members of Halictidae, the tip of the mandible of these bees is shaped like a glove, distinguishing them from a species that closely resembles them, Augochlora pura. The marginal cell of the forewing is pointed and not squared off, which is another easy way to tell A. aurata from Augochlora pura.

Life cycle 
Augochlorella aurata is a generally primitively social ground nesting bee. Their usual active season begins with a foundress phase in which all of the overwintered bees will start a first brood of both males and females. After this first brood emerges in early summer, the females become workers and the foundresses become queens, starting the worker phase. The next phase is the reproductive phase, in which workers assist the queen in raising a second brood towards the end of summer. This second brood will then mate in early fall, the inseminated females overwintering and going on to start the cycle anew as foundresses the next season. Although most A. aurata will at least roughly stick to this cycle, there have been studies that prove that they will not always follow it exactly, going through the worker phase more than once or becoming completely solitary.

Distribution and habitat 

Augochlorella aurata is found throughout the United states, clustering mostly around the east coast and spreading westward. There have been sparse occurrences of A. aurata as west as California and as south as South America. A. aurata inhabits the range furthest north in the Augochlorini tribe.

Taxonomy and phylogeny 
Augochlorella aurata is a bee within the family Halictidae, in which 4 subfamilies, 81 genera, and over 4,000 species are currently described. It is within the tribe Augochlorini.

References

Further reading

External links

 

Halictidae
Articles created by Qbugbot
Insects described in 1853